Pierre Courthion (1902-1988) was a Swiss art critic and historian.

Courthion was educated at the University of Geneva and was awarded a scholarship to study painting at the École des Beaux-Arts in Paris. At the Louvre, he did his doctorate on the painter, Jean-Étienne Liotard.

In 1941, Courthion interviewed  Henri Matisse, but after months of difficult negotiations, Matisse refused to have the resulting book published, just a few weeks before it was due to come out. The "lost" interview was not published until 2013.

His papers are held at the Getty Research Institute in Los Angeles, California.

Publications
Panorama de la peinture française contemporaine
D'une palette à l'autre : Mémoires d'un critique d'art
La Peinture flamande : de Van Eyck à Bruegel
Bonnard : peintre du merveilleux
Soutine : peintre du déchirant
Les Impressionnistes
Le Visage de Matisse
La Vie de Delacroix
Delacroix : journal et correspondance
Paris : de sa naissance à nos jours
D'une palette à l'autre: mémoires d'un critique d'art, autobiography, 2004

References

1902 births
1988 deaths
Swiss art critics
Swiss art historians